William Patrick Duggan (12 March 1950 – 28 August 2017) was an Irish international rugby union player. He won 41 Irish caps, the first in 1975 and finished his international career in 1984 as captain. He toured New Zealand in 1977 with the British and Irish Lions, and at the time played club rugby for Blackrock College RFC, after commencing his career with Sunday's Well RFC in Cork.

Career
On the pitch, Duggan was widely regarded as the premier No. 8 in Europe at the time, which was reflected in his being picked for the Lions in 1977. He was widely regarded as one of the hard men of world rugby at the time, despite not enjoying training and being a heavy smoker. On one occasion he was smoking a cigarette as he ran onto the pitch to play against France, passing the cigarette to referee Allan Hosie, who was pictured holding the cigarette in the television coverage. Told by a coach that if he gave up the smokes he would be faster around the pitch, he replied "but then I would spend most of the match offside".

In January 1977, he became, along with Wales' Geoff Wheel, the first player to be sent off in a Five Nations match. According to fellow player Moss Keane, Duggan did not consider himself to have been sent off, simply being asked by the referee "would he mind leaving the field", to which he replied "Sure not at all. I was buggered anyway".

Personal life
He lived and worked in Kilkenny, where he ran the lighting shop that he took over from his father (Willie Duggan Lighting Ltd.). He remained a huge supporter of the game and was one of the most revered and loved rugby players in the history of the Irish game.

On 28 August 2017, Duggan died from an aneurysm at his home in Dunmore, just outside Kilkenny city.

References

External links

1950 births
2017 deaths
Irish rugby union players
Ireland international rugby union players
British & Irish Lions rugby union players from Ireland
Blackrock College RFC players
People educated at Rockwell College
Rugby union number eights